John Marshall Robsion (January 2, 1873February 17, 1948), a Republican, represented Kentucky in both the United States Senate and the United States House of Representatives.

Robsion was born in Berlin, Kentucky.  He attended National Northern University, now Ohio Northern University, in Ada, Ohio, and Holbrook College in Knoxville, Tennessee.  He graduated from the National Normal University in Lebanon, Ohio.  He then earned a law degree from Centre College in Danville, Kentucky in 1900.

Robsion taught in public schools for several years and at Union College in Barbourville, Kentucky.  He also practiced law in Barbourville and was the president of the First National Bank of Barbourville.

Robsion was elected to the United States House of Representatives as a Republican to the Sixty-sixth and to the five succeeding Congresses and served from March 4, 1919, until January 10, 1930, when he resigned to serve in the United States Senate.  He served as chairman of the Committee on Mines and Mining (Sixty-eighth through Seventy-first Congresses).

He was appointed on January 9, 1930, as a Republican to the Senate to fill the vacancy caused by the resignation of Frederick M. Sackett and he served in the Senate from January 11, 1930, to November 30, 1930.  He was an unsuccessful candidate for election to the same seat in 1930.  After leaving the Senate, Robsion resumed the practice of law and was elected to the United States House of Representatives Seventy-fourth and to the six succeeding Congresses and served from January 3, 1935, until his death in Barbourville, Ky., February 17, 1948.  He is buried in Barbourville Cemetery.

See also
 List of United States Congress members who died in office (1900–49)

External links
 

1873 births
1948 deaths
People from Bracken County, Kentucky
Centre College alumni
Ohio Northern University alumni
Burials in Kentucky
American Disciples of Christ
Republican Party United States senators from Kentucky
Republican Party members of the United States House of Representatives from Kentucky